An effects cymbal is a cymbal used in a drum kit for a special effect or accent. Effects cymbals include splash cymbals, china cymbals and many other less common types.

This classification is widely accepted but enigmatic. When pang and swish cymbals are used as ride cymbals they are not considered effects cymbals, despite their exotic tone. On the other hand, the most common six-piece cymbal setup consists of hi-hats, ride cymbal, two crash cymbals of slightly different sizes and possibly weights, one splash and one china type, so effects cymbals must be considered a standard part of an extended drum kit.

Varieties

Splash cymbals
 
Splash Cymbals range from 6" - 12". Traditional splash cymbals are relatively quiet and don't last for long, but have a high pitch sound.

China cymbals

China Cymbals range from 12" - 26". They are one of the loudest cymbals for the drum kit. Where you hit the china makes a huge difference to its sound. They are basically a smaller version of a Chinese gong (where its name originates from). China cymbals can be used up-side down to produce a 'cleaner' noise. When used the right way up, china cymbals produce more 'attack.'

Others

There are many other custom effect cymbals, in great variety from different makers.

Drumbal cymbals are designed to rest on the top skin of a snare drum to modify its tone.

Rocktagon cymbals by Sabian are a unique eight-sided design, midway between a crash and a china.

Cymbals